Ardisia standleyana is a species of plant in the family Primulaceae. It is found in Colombia, Costa Rica, Nicaragua, and Panama.

References

standleyana
Least concern plants
Taxonomy articles created by Polbot